Robert Joseph Feerick (January 2, 1920 – June 8, 1976) was an American professional basketball player, coach and general manager. He was born in San Francisco, California.

Playing career
A 6'3" guard from Santa Clara University, Feerick played for the Washington Capitols from 1946 to 1950, the NBA's first four seasons of existence (the league was known as the Basketball Association of America during the first three). Playing under coach Red Auerbach, he was named to the All-NBA first team in 1947 and 1948 after averaging 16.8 (second in the league behind Joe Fulks's 23.1) and 16.1 points per game respectively. In 1949, the league's first season as the newly formed NBA, the Capitols named Feerick player-coach.
In 221 games, he scored 2936 points for an average of 13.3 per game.

Coaching career
After his short professional career, Feerick returned to Santa Clara as head coach of its basketball team from 1950 to 1962. Feerick also was Wilt Chamberlain's personal coach with the San Francisco Warriors during the 1962–63 season. The franchise had just relocated from Philadelphia and hired Feerick, the native San Franciscan, to replace Frank McGuire, who resigned rather than make the move with the team. The Warriors finished 31–49 for their first year in San Francisco after losing to the Boston Celtics in each of the previous three Eastern Division finals. 

The following season, Alex Hannum replaced Feerick as coach.  Feerick later served the Warriors as general manager and director of player personnel.
He was a finalist for the NBA 25th Anniversary Team in 1971. He is one of only two members nominated to the team not in the Naismith Basketball Hall of Fame.

BAA/NBA career statistics

Regular season

Playoffs

Head coaching record

College

Professional

|-
| style="text-align:left;"|WSC
| style="text-align:left;"|
|68||32||36||.471|| style="text-align:center;"|3rd in Eastern||2||0||2||.000
| style="text-align:center;"|Lost in Eastern Div. Semifinals
|-
| style="text-align:left;"|SFW
| style="text-align:left;"|
|80||31||49||.388|| style="text-align:center;"|4th in Western||-||-||-||-
| style="text-align:center;"|Missed Playoffs
|- class="sortbottom"
| style="text-align:left;"|Career
| ||148||63||85||.426|| ||2||0||2||.000

See also
 List of NCAA Division I Men's Final Four appearances by coach

References

External links
 Feerick's pro statistics (as a player)
 Feerick's pro statistics (as a coach)

1920 births
1976 deaths
American men's basketball coaches
American men's basketball players
Basketball coaches from California
Basketball players from San Francisco
Forwards (basketball)
Golden State Warriors executives
Golden State Warriors head coaches
Guards (basketball)
Player-coaches
San Francisco Warriors head coaches
Santa Clara Broncos athletic directors
Santa Clara Broncos men's basketball coaches
Santa Clara Broncos men's basketball players
Washington Capitols players
Washington Capitols coaches